The Gulf of Carpentaria Marine Park (formerly known as the Gulf of Carpentaria Commonwealth Marine Reserve) is an Australian marine park in the Gulf of Carpentaria, offshore of Queensland and north of Mornington Island. It is one of 8 parks managed under the North Marine Parks Network.

Conservation values

Species and habitat
Important resting area for turtles between egg laying (internesting area), for the threatened: flatback turtle and green turtle.
Important foraging habitat for breeding aggregations of the: migratory brown booby, migratory lesser frigatebird, migratory roseate tern, listed marine crested tern.

Bioregions and ecology
Examples of the ecosystems of the Northern Shelf Province provincial bioregion (including the Carpentaria, Karumba-Nassau and Wellesley meso-scale bioregions).
Gulf of Carpentaria coastal zone (high productivity; biodiversity and endemism; aggregations of marine life).
Gulf of Carpentaria basin (biodiversity; aggregations of marine life).
Plateau and saddle north-west of the Wellesley Islands (biodiversity and endemism; high aggregations of marine life).
Submerged coral reefs of the Gulf of Carpentaria (biodiversity and endemism; high aggregations of marine life).

History
The marine park was proclaimed under the EPBC Act on 14 December 2013 and renamed Gulf of Carpentaria Marine Park on 9 October 2017. The management plan and protection measures of the marine park came into effect for the first time on 1 July 2018.

Summary of protection zones
The Gulf of Carpentaria Marine Park has been assigned IUCN protected area category VI. However, within the marine park there are two protection zones, each zone has an IUCN category and related rules for managing activities to ensure the protection of marine habitats and species.

The following table is a summary of the zoning rules within the Gulf of Carpentaria Marine Park:

See also

 Protected areas managed by the Australian government

References

External links
 North Marine Parks Network - Parks Australia
 North Marine Parks Network - environment.gov.au (outdated)

Australian marine parks